The Simpsonville Stone Arch Bridge is a historic stone arch bridge, carrying Vermont Route 35 across Simpson Brook, north of the village of Townshend, Vermont.  Built about 1909, it is one of a few surviving bridges in the region built by local mason James Otis Follett.  It was listed on the National Register of Historic Places in 1977.

Description and history
The bridge is built out of rough-cut and roughly-course granite blocks, now mortared with a variety of materials. The wing walls obscure portions of the arch, including its spandrels and abutments  The bridge has been widened by the addition of steel culverts to both sides, further obscuring the original structure.

This bridge is one of more than about 40 built in Towshend and other nearby communities by James Otis Follett, a local mason.  Of thirteen bridges built by Follett in Townshend, only six survived when this bridge was listed on the National Register of Historic Places in 1977.  Follett's entire opus is distinctive, as it was produced at a time when most bridges were built with iron and steel.  This appears to have been one of the last he built before his death in 1911.

See also
National Register of Historic Places listings in Windham County, Vermont
List of bridges on the National Register of Historic Places in Vermont

References

Road bridges on the National Register of Historic Places in Vermont
Bridges completed in 1909
Bridges in Windham County, Vermont
National Register of Historic Places in Windham County, Vermont
Stone arch bridges in the United States